The Europe Zone was one of the two regional zones of the 1932 International Lawn Tennis Challenge.

22 teams entered the Europe Zone, with the winner going on to compete in the Inter-Zonal Final against the winner of the America Zone. Germany defeated Italy in the final, and went on to face the United States in the Inter-Zonal Final.

Draw

First round

Italy vs. Egypt

Norway vs. Monaco

Belgium vs. Switzerland

Czechoslovakia vs. Austria

Germany vs. India

Hungary vs. Finland

Second round

Denmark vs. Yugoslavia

Greece vs. Japan

Italy vs. Spain

Switzerland vs. Monaco

Austria vs. Germany

Ireland vs. Hungary

Great Britain vs. Romania

Poland vs. Netherlands

Quarterfinals

Denmark vs. Japan

Switzerland vs. Italy

Germany vs. Ireland

Poland vs. Great Britain

Semifinals

Italy vs. Japan

Germany vs. Great Britain

Final

Italy vs. Germany

References

External links
Davis Cup official website

Davis Cup Europe/Africa Zone
Europe Zone
International Lawn Tennis Challenge